Sayed Noorullah Murad (born March 22, 1979) is an Afghan politician, military commander and member of the Afghan cabinet during the presidency of Hamid Karzai. He was born in Kunduz city in the north of Afghanistan. His father is Mawlawi Abdul Jalil Faqiri, a famous religious and social leader of Afghanistan.

At the age of 03 Murad migrated to Pakistan, after the Soviet invasion of Afghanistan. He attended various educational institutions in Pakistan and graduated from the University of Peshawar with obtaining a bachelor's degree in journalism and later a master's degree in international relations. Despite this, Murad has also obtained a degree equal to a master's in Islamic studies Wifaqul Madares in Multan Pakistan.

Murad has followed his father and joined the Jamiat-e-Islami Party during the jihad. During the 1990s he started work as special advisor in political and tribal affairs to Ahmad Shah Massoud, then Afghan minister of defence. He was promoted to the rank of Major General of the Afghan national army and has also worked as chief military commander in southern zone of Afghanistan fighting against the Taliban.

Due to a misunderstanding Murad was kept for over a year in the Doab jail (Panjshir province) by Ahmad Shah Massoud and was released in 2001 by intervention of Yunus Qanuni and general Besmillah Muhammadi.

After jail he was forced by his father followers to restart his political activities in the current political arena and announced political pluralistic system, hence adopted a new liberal Political party (DA NEJAT AFGHANI GHORZANG) Afghan Salvation Movement.

Murad is also chairing an organisation called Islamic Studies Development center (ISDC) to modernise, madredize and enlighten religious sector of Afghanistan and bring it to right direction.  He has worked for Afghan Ministry of Education from 2001 to 2004 as general director for international relations and NGO's, and head of the grant management unit (GMU). In 2004 he was promoted to chief secretary of the Independent civil services commission.

In July 2005 he was assigned as a member of Afghan Federal Cabinet and Deputy Minister for religious affairs and Hajj. In this position he introduced several reforms to the religious sector in Afghanistan which caused appreciations and opposition from community and government. In September 2009 he resigned because of principle differences with running the administrative system.

After a long break, General Murad was appointed by president of Afghanistan as chief advisor to the Minister of Interior Affairs of the Islamic Republic of Afghanistan in March 2017.
In August 2020 General Murad was appointed as chairman and general director of the national traffic police authority in the Ministry of Interior Affairs, Islamic republic of Afghanistan.
General Murad has introduced several changes and reforms to the traffic system of the country like digitization of the national and international driving licences and vehicle registration.
After domination of the Taliban General Murad was removed from his position as inspector general of traffic police authority.

References

External links
http://www.riddle.ru/mirrors/factbook2009/fields/2118.html
http://www.afghanemb-canada.net/public-affairs-afghanistan-embassy-canada-ottawa/daily-news-bulletin-afghanistan-embassy-canada-ottawa/2007/news_articles/november/11242007.html
http://www.afghanistannewscenter.com/news/2007/november/nov252007.html
https://web.archive.org/web/20141229030837/http://www.pajhwok.com/en/2007/01/15/hajis-angry-over-delay-ariana-flights  
http://www.onlinenews.com.pk/details.php?id=110390  
http://www.bsharat.com/id/5/15.html 
https://web.archive.org/web/20120615084144/http://balooch.net/index.php?option=com_content&view=article&id=38:afghanistani&catid=9:1388-08-17-12-45-05  

1969 births
Living people